Malick Laye Thiaw (born 8 August 2001) is a German professional footballer who plays as a centre-back for Serie A club AC Milan.

Club career
In his childhood Thiaw played for TV Kalkum-Wittlaer, a club in Düsseldorf. Via Fortuna Düsseldorf, Bayer 04 Leverkusen, and Borussia Mönchengladbach he joined the youth academy of Schalke 04 in 2015. He made his professional debut with Schalke in a 1–1 draw against Hoffenheim in the Bundesliga on 7 March 2020.

AC Milan
On 29 August 2022, Thiaw signed with Serie A club AC Milan a contract until 30 June 2027.

International career
Thiaw was born and raised in Germany to a Senegalese father and Finnish mother, and holds German and Finnish passports. In 2017, he was called up to represent the Finland U17s, but did not play for them. On 15 March 2021, Thiaw was called up to represent the Germany U21s for the 2021 UEFA European Under-21 Championship.

Career statistics

Honours 
Schalke 04
2. Bundesliga: 2021–22

References

External links
 Profile at the AC Milan website
 

2001 births
German people of Finnish descent
German people of Senegalese descent
German sportspeople of African descent
Living people
Footballers from Düsseldorf
German footballers
Germany under-21 international footballers
Finnish footballers
Finnish people of Senegalese descent
Association football defenders
FC Schalke 04 players
A.C. Milan players
Bundesliga players
2. Bundesliga players
German expatriate footballers
Finnish expatriate sportspeople
Expatriate footballers in Italy
German expatriate sportspeople in Italy
Finnish expatriate sportspeople in Italy